= Chy Sila =

Cambodian businessman (born 1974)

Chy Sila (born 1974) is a Cambodian businessman. He is the CEO of Sabay Digital Media, a company he founded in 2007.

== Biography ==
Chy Sila was born in Cambodia in 1974. While he originally planned to be a lawyer or architect, Sila dropped out of college at the age of 18 to pursue a career as a private entrepreneur. Initially working as a tour guide, Sila's first successful business ventures centered around pirated CDs. His company expanded through the late 1990s and early 2000s, at which point Sila chose to shift focus from pirated electronics to fast food. In 2001 Sila founded BB World, a burger-focused fast food restaurant chain. He also founded a chain of coffee cafes under the name T&C in 2003.

In 2007 Sila began investing in the-then growing web industry in Cambodia. He founded a media company, Sabay, in 2007. As of 2017, Sila remained the CEO of the company.

== Film ==
Sila was a producer of two Khmer movie, Poppy Goes to Hollywood in 2016 and I'm Not a Fool in 2018.
